Quidi Vidi Brewing Company is a craft brewery in Quidi Vidi village, a neighbourhood of St. John's, Newfoundland and Labrador, Canada.

Founded in 1996 by David Fong in a former fish plant, the brewery is an important tourist destination. Currently, over 25 different brews are offered year round; including the famous blue bottled Iceberg Beer, which is made with 20,000 year old iceberg water which is harvested from icebergs off the coast of Newfoundland.

Quidi Vidi Brewery is the third-largest brewer in the province of Newfoundland and Labrador, after Labatt and Molson. Its products are available province-wide in liquor stores, corner stores and on draft. Quidi Vidi Brewery’s beer can also be found in other provinces across Canada like Nova Scotia, Prince Edward Island, Manitoba, Saskatchewan, and Alberta.

Products

+ indicates product is discontinued.

Lagers
 Iceberg Lager (since 1996)
 'Son of a Critch' Lager
 Oktoberfest Marzen Lager
 Dry Hopped Lager
 Outhouse Homebrew Light Lager
 Crown & Anchor Light Lager
 RDL Craft Lager
 Premium Lager +
 Margarita Cerveza Lager
 Newfermenters Series - Half Nelson Sour Lager

Stouts
 Cappuccino Stout
 Imperial Black Forest Stout
 Russian Imperial Stout
 Dry Irish Stout

Ales
 1892 Traditional Ale
 American Pale Ale
 Brewer's Original Series - Nathan's Kveik Pale Ale
 Mummer's Brew Cream Ale
 Honey Brown Ale +
 Eric's Cream Ale +

IPAs
 Arts & IPAs 02 - East Meets West IPA
 Arts & IPAs 03 - Rye IPA
 Arts & IPAs 04 - Orange Creamsicle IPA
 Oceanside Session IPA
 Squeezebox New England IPA
 Squeezebox New England IPA w/ Idaho 7
 Dayboil Session IPA
 Calm Tom Double IPA
 British IPA
 Milky Way New England IPA +

Sours
 Art Skeet Dry-Hopped Sour
 Director's Cut - Strawberry Kiwi Sour
 Iron Cherry Sour
 Aloha Sour
 Sofa Sour - Pink Lemonade
 Sofa Sour - Pomegranate Strawberry Creamsicle
 Sofa Sour - Peach Raspberry
 Sofa Sour - Strawberry Guava Creamsicle
 Sofa Sour - Passion Fruit
 Sofa Sour - Pineapple
 Sofa Sour - Each Peach, Pear, Plum
 Sofa Sour - Key Lime Cherry

Newfermenter Series
 Newfermenters Series - Lost in Time
 Newfermenters Series - Sabby Sour
 Newfermenters Series - Wisdom and Wit
 Newfermenters Series - Darkstar

Other Beers
 Weizenhammer
 Brewer's Original Series - Isaac's Czech Pilsner
 Brewer's Original Series - Jason's Hopfenweisse
 Brewer's Original Series - Al's Biere de Garde
 Rhinegold Red Altbier
 American Wheat
 Mad Mike's Big Bad Belgian
 Three Seasons Saison
 Imperial Coconut Porter
 Uncle Fred's +
 Perfect Storm +

References

Breweries in Canada
Cuisine of Newfoundland and Labrador
Companies based in St. John's, Newfoundland and Labrador